The abbreviation IACHR is commonly used to refer to either of the two bodies of the inter-American human rights protection system:

 Inter-American Commission on Human Rights
 Inter-American Court of Human Rights